The 21st Golden Bell Awards was held on 22 March 1986 at the Sun Yat-sen Memorial Hall in Taipei, Taiwan. The ceremony was broadcast by Chinese Television System (CTS).

Winners

References

1986
1986 in Taiwan